Oryctodiplax is an extinct genus of dragonfly in the family Libellulidae.

Fossils (mainly larvae) of these dragonflies have been found in the Miocene of Italy (age range: from 7.246 to 5.332 million years ago).

The type species is Oryctodiplax gypsorum. It was a species resistant to a highly saline environment, formed in the Mediterranean salinity crisis, occurred during the latest stage of the Miocene, with the isolation of the Mediterranean sea and its subsequent drying.

References

 O. Cavallo and P. A. Galletti. 1987. Studi di Carlo Sturani du Odonati e altri insetti fossili del Messiniano albese (Piemonte) con descrizione di Oryctodiplax gypsorum n. gen., n. sp. (Odonata, Libellulidae). Bollettino della Società Paleontologica Italiana 26(1-2):151-176

Libellulidae